Vaginula rodericensis is a species of air-breathing land slug, terrestrial pulmonate gastropod mollusk in the family Veronicellidae, the leatherleaf slugs.

References

Veronicellidae